Chopul (also Romanized as Chopūl and Chapūl; also known as Chupul’) is a village in Sardar-e Jangal Rural District, Sardar-e Jangal District, Fuman County, Gilan Province, Iran. At the 2006 census, its population was 199, in 50 families.

References 

Populated places in Fuman County